The South African Railways Class NG G16 2-6-2+2-6-2 was a narrow gauge steam locomotive.

Between 1937 and 1968, the South African Railways placed 34 Class NG G16 Garratt articulated  steam locomotives in service on the Avontuur Railway and on the Natal narrow gauge lines.

Manufacturers

The success of the Class NG G13 narrow gauge Garratts that were introduced by the South African Railways (SAR) in 1927 led to a decision that any additional narrow gauge articulated locomotives would be of the same design. Altogether 34 more  Double Prairie type narrow gauge locomotives were built, spread over five orders from three manufacturers over a span of 32 years.

Cockerill
In 1937, Société Anonyme John Cockerill of Seraing in Belgium delivered four new  locomotives, numbered in the range from NG85 to NG88, which were so similar to the older locomotives that they were initially designated Class NG G13 as well. However, in view of the fact that all the carrying wheels were fitted with roller bearing axle boxes and arranged as swiveling pony trucks, compared to the Class NG G13 of which the inner carrying wheels were built to the Gölsdorf system which allowed the axle some lateral movement, it was soon decided to reclassify them to Class .

These pre-war locomotives, like the earlier Class NG G13 locomotives, were built with riveted coal and water bunkers and with elliptical tops on the water tanks.

Beyer, Peacock
The second order of eight locomotives was delivered from Beyer, Peacock & Company, England in 1939. They were numbered in the range from NG109 to NG116.

The third order was for a further seven locomotives in 1951, numbered in the range from NG125 to NG131, once again from Beyer, Peacock. They still had elliptical tops on the water tanks and both tank and bunker were riveted as per the pre-war machines, however on the boiler the location of the safety valves, clack valves and main manifold (amongst other details) changed to what would become the standard for all remaining builds.

The fourth batch of seven locomotives, numbered in the range from NG137 to NG143, were the last steam locomotives to be built by Beyer, Peacock and were built to the specifications of the Tsumeb Copper Corporation in South West Africa (SWA). They were mechanically similar to the earlier and subsequent Class  locomotives, but with a revised coal and water carrying arrangement. These locomotives had an enlarged front water tank capacity, but carried no water in their rear bunkers which consequently had a larger coal capacity. They had flat-topped water tanks with rounded top side edges, and were the first NGG16s to have welded tanks. It was planned to use them as tank-and-tender Garratts, semi-permanently attached to a water tender for use across the Namib desert in SWA, as was the practice with the Cape gauge Classes GM, GMA and GO tank-and-tender Garratts in South Africa.

However, while the locomotives were being built, the decision was made to convert all the SWA narrow gauge lines to Cape gauge. In terms of a prior agreement between the SAR and the Tsumeb Copper Corporation, the SAR would purchase any narrow gauge locomotives that would become redundant should the re-gauging of the SWA system take place. The new locomotives were therefore delivered directly to the SAR in 1958.

On the Avontuur Railway, these locomotives were used as tank-and-tender Garratts, but when the Langkloof members of the class were transferred to Natal in 1964, the water tenders were dispensed with since watering points were much closer together in Natal as a consequence of the early use of tank engines on those narrow-gauge branches.

Hunslet-Taylor
The final order for eight locomotives in 1967, numbered in the range from NG149 to NG156, turned out to be the last new steam locomotives to be ordered by the SAR. Beyer-Peacock had stopped building steam locomotives after the last batch of Class  in 1958 and by 1968 they were in the process of closing the business altogether. Since no other overseas manufacturers were available to supply them, they were built by Hunslet-Taylor in Germiston using boilers supplied by their overseas principals, the Hunslet Engine Company in England. Built in 1967 and 1968, these locomotives had the same enlarged capacity front water tanks as those of the Tsumeb group, but their rear bunkers were identical to those of the 1951 batch of locomotives and carried both coal and water.

Cabside number plates
After the Official Languages of the Union Act No 8 of 1925 was passed on 8 May 1925, bilingual English and Afrikaans cabside number plates began to appear on SAR locomotives, initially inscribed "SOUTH AFRICAN RAILWAYS" at the top and "SUID AFRIKANSE SPOORWEË" at the bottom. The Afrikaans spelling conventions were changed from time to time in the early years. On postage stamps, for example, it was "Zuid Afrika" from 1913, "Suidafrika" from the airmail stamps of 1925 and hyphenated "Suid-Afrika" from 1933. On cabside number plates, the spelling of the Afrikaans inscription was later altered with "AFRIKANSE" changed to "AFRIKAANSE" and with "SUID AFRIKAANSE SPOORWEË" unhyphenated, and stil later to "SUID-AFRIKAANSE SPOORWEË" hyphenated.

The Cockerill-built locomotives were delivered with bilingual cabside number plates inscribed "NG/G13" and with the older style Afrikaans "SUID AFRIKANSE SPOORWEË" at the bottom. When they were designated Class NG G16, the "NG/G13" was altered to "NG/G16" by milling out the 3 and riveting on a 6, as shown.

Service
The Cockerill locomotives, numbers NG85 to NG88, remained in Natal for most of their service lives.

The Beyer, Peacock locomotives ordered by the SAR, numbers NG109 to NG116 and NG125 to NG131, were shared more or less equally between the Natal and Langkloof lines.

The seven Beyer, Peacock locomotives ordered by the Tsumeb Copper Corporation, numbers NG137 to NG143, were initially distributed between the Umzinto, Port Shepstone and Avontuur lines, but in 1964 the three that went to the Langkloof were also transferred to Natal.

The Hunslet-Taylor locomotives, numbers NG149 to NG156, were placed in service on the Harding and Donnybrook branches in Natal in 1968.

When the lower section of the Avontuur line was dieselised upon the arrival of the Class 91-000 diesel-electric locomotives in 1973, all the Class  locomotives still in service were transferred to various branches in Natal, where they remained until they were withdrawn from service.

Class NG G16A
When the four Natal narrow gauge systems were closed down by the SAR, the Weenen and Mid-Illovo lines were lifted, but the Harding line was privatised as the Alfred County Railway (ACR), operating out of Port Shepstone.

As part of their strategy to keep the railway competitive, two of the ACR's Class  locomotives were rebuilt using technology similar to that used in the Cape gauge Class 26 Red Devil. The rebuilding incorporated a gas producing combustion system (GPCS), Lempor exhausts, an improved spark arrester, lightweight multi-ring articulated piston valves, improved valve events and improved mechanical lubrication. The two locomotives which received this treatment, no. NG141 in 1989 and no. NG155 in 1990, were reclassified to Class NG G16A.

In comparative testing, no. NG141 achieved a fuel saving of 25% compared to a standard Class  Garratt, a performance which was easily maintained in regular service. The cost of the work paid off financially within twelve months and led to a proposal to develop a Class NG G17, but that never materialised since the line's farming produce traffic was gradually lost to road transport on the improving road network.

Preservation
Since withdrawal from SAR service, some locomotives were sold to foreign railways and into private hands and restored to operational condition, while others ended up in various degrees of preservation ranging across the spectrum from running order to staging to total abandonment. In 2017, at least four establishments still operated or were restoring ex-SAR Class  Garratts. Several however, have now been cut up for scrap (see table below).

Welsh Highland Railway
The Welsh Highland Railway in Wales has five Class  locomotives. One, no. NG140, is used as a source of spare parts while four locomotives, Cockerill-built no. NG87 and Beyer, Peacock-built numbers NG130, NG138 and NG143, are used for operational purposes.

Sandstone Estates
The Sandstone Estates near Ficksburg in the Free State is home to a large number of Class  locomotives, either as the owners or as the custodian for locomotives belonging to individuals or other establishments. Three of their Class  locomotives are homed here, and are regularly run during the Estate's annual events like the Cosmos Festival, Cherry Festival, Stars of Sandstone and others. These are Cockerill-built no. NG88, Beyer, Peacock-built no. NG113 and Hunslet-Taylor-built no. NG153.

Puffing Billy Railway
The Puffing Billy Railway, located in the Dandenong Ranges east of Melbourne, Australia, purchased NG129 in August 1996 from ACR shareholder Peter Newton. Completion of no. NG129's restoration was planned to coincide with the next time that no. G42 was to be withdrawn for major maintenance. The Puffing Billy Railway also purchased no. NG127 from Peter Newton in November 2011. This gave them a second almost-complete Class NG G16 which will possibly also be totally rebuilt in the future. After first being steamed in September 2019 129, in November 2019 it underwent light engine and load testing.

Distribution
The last known fate of all the Class  locomotives, as of October 25th 2022, are shown in Table I.

Works numbers
Their engine numbers, builders, years built and works numbers are listed in Table II.

References

External links

Cockerill locomotives
Beyer, Peacock locomotives
Garratt locomotives
Hunslet-Taylor locomotives
Preserved narrow gauge steam locomotives of Great Britain
Railway locomotives introduced in 1937
Steam locomotives of South Africa
2-6-2+2-6-2 locomotives
2 ft gauge locomotives